Carentino is a comune (municipality) in the Province of Alessandria in the Italian region of Piedmont, located about  southeast of Turin and about  southwest of Alessandria.  

Carentino borders the following municipalities: Bergamasco, Borgoratto Alessandrino, Bruno, Frascaro, Gamalero, Mombaruzzo, and Oviglio.

References

Cities and towns in Piedmont